The Ed Thorp Memorial Trophy was the trophy awarded to the champions of the National Football League (NFL) from 1934 through 1967. The trophy was named after Ed Thorp, a noted referee, rules expert, sporting goods dealer, and friend to many of the early NFL owners. Thorp died in June 1934, and a large, traveling trophy was made later that year. It was to be passed along from champion to champion each season with each championship team's name inscribed on it.

Unlike the modern day Lombardi trophies, the Ed Thorp Memorial Trophy did not become the possession of the winning team, but instead spent a year with the winning team before being passed on to the next year’s champion, much like the Grey Cup in the Canadian Football League or the Stanley Cup in the National Hockey League. For a brief period in the 1930s, teams winning the league championship were awarded a smaller replica of the Ed Thorp Memorial Trophy, which they were allowed to keep, in addition to the year spent with the larger traveling trophy.

In 2015, it was found the trophy was in possession of the Green Bay Packers Hall of Fame, along with two other copies of it.  How the trophy came to be in the possession of the Hall of Fame, rather than the team itself, was eventually solved in June, 2018, by Packers historian Cliff Christl.

Some of the trophies, such as the two replicas the Green Bay Packers won in 1936 and 1939, have Thorp misspelled as Thorpe, showing that the name Ed Thorp was not a household name at the time.

Disappearance

The original theory of what happened was that the Minnesota Vikings, who were thought to be the last to win the Trophy in 1969, somehow lost it when the league switched over to the Lombardi Trophy the following year. The Vikings after winning the Thorp Trophy went on to face the American Football League champion the Kansas City Chiefs in the AFL-NFL World Championship Game (which is more commonly referred to as Super Bowl IV). The spirit of Ed Thorp was rumored to have cursed the Vikings, since they lost the trophy that was named in his honor. To date, the team has lost all four Super Bowls, and the last six NFC Championships they have played in.

A similar incident occurred to the first trophy that was awarded to the NFL Champions, the Brunswick-Balke Collender Cup. In 1920, after the Akron Pros were awarded the league championship, that trophy also went missing (like the Thorp trophy, it too was initially to be passed down to each successive champion). The Washington Commanders replica of the Thorp Trophy is on display at FedExField.

Rediscovery
In 2015, the Thorp Trophy was found to have been in the possession of the Green Bay Packers Hall of Fame instead of with the Vikings. Initially, the Packers and the NFL didn't know how it got there and many theories on how it got there were proposed. Also, the trophy only included the engraved names of the winners from the 1934 New York Giants to the 1951 Los Angeles Rams, adding to the mystery. The trophy was put on display at the Packers Hall of Fame.

After some research by various teams, it was discovered that, contrary to original belief, there had been only six of the individual trophies awarded to teams for their victories, with five of them coming during then-NFL president Joseph Carr's life, and a sixth not long after his death: Those of the 1934 and 1938 New York Giants, the 1935 Detroit Lions, the 1937 Washington Redskins, and the 1936 and 1939 Green Bay Packers, along with one trophy given out to the 1961 Green Bay Packers that was first not thought to be part of the original pattern, being differently shaped than the ones originally presented.

In 2018, a Green Bay Press-Gazette photo from 1962 was donated from a fan, and a trophy base from the Packers Hall of Fame Inc. was found at the bottom of a cardboard box. With this, it was discovered that: the trophy on display since 2015 was not fully displayed, with there being names of the winners engraved on the rediscovered base from the 1952 Detroit Lions to the 1967 Green Bay Packers (with the exception of the 1960 Philadelphia Eagles) and that the trophy was the same one that had been given to the Packers in 1961, which was confirmed to be the traveling Ed Thorp Trophy. After the base was discovered, it was reattached to the trophy, thus fully listing the winners from 1934 through 1967 (except 1960) and the complete trophy is now on display at the Packers Hall of Fame.

The 1960 Philadelphia Eagles are not found engraved anywhere on the trophy, being the only team from 1934 through 1967 to not be engraved, although there is a space left for them. It had previously been assumed that the 1968 and 1969 champions, the Baltimore Colts and Minnesota Vikings (both of whom had lost their respective Super Bowls), had been awarded the trophy, but no engravings are present honoring either one (though that could be because there was no room left to engrave them).

List of Ed Thorp Memorial Trophy winners

1934 New York Giants
1935 Detroit Lions
1936 Green Bay Packers
1937 Washington Redskins
1938 New York Giants
1939 Green Bay Packers
1940 Chicago Bears
1941 Chicago Bears
1942 Washington Redskins
1943 Chicago Bears
1944 Green Bay Packers
1945 Cleveland Rams
1946 Chicago Bears
1947 Chicago Cardinals
1948 Philadelphia Eagles
1949 Philadelphia Eagles
1950 Cleveland Browns
1951 Los Angeles Rams
1952 Detroit Lions
1953 Detroit Lions
1954 Cleveland Browns
1955 Cleveland Browns
1956 New York Giants
1957 Detroit Lions
1958 Baltimore Colts 
1959 Baltimore Colts
1960 Philadelphia Eagles
1961 Green Bay Packers
1962 Green Bay Packers
1963 Chicago Bears
1964 Cleveland Browns
1965 Green Bay Packers
1966 Green Bay Packers
1967 Green Bay Packers

Total trophies won

Non-winners (5): Pittsburgh Steelers, San Francisco 49ers, Dallas Cowboys, Atlanta Falcons, New Orleans Saints

See also
Vince Lombardi Trophy
NFC Championship Game
Brunswick-Balke Collender Cup
List of National Football League awards

References

National Football League trophies and awards
Awards established in 1934
1934 establishments in the United States